Harmony Township is the name of two townships in the U.S. state of Indiana:

 Harmony Township, Posey County, Indiana
 Harmony Township, Union County, Indiana

Indiana township disambiguation pages